Takht-i-Bahi (Persian/), is an Indo-Parthian archaeological site of an ancient Buddhist monastery in Mardan, Khyber-Pakhtunkhwa, Pakistan. The site is considered among the most important relics of Buddhism in all of what was once Gandhara, and has been "exceptionally well-preserved."

The  monastery was founded in the 1st century CE,  and was in use until the 7th century. The complex is regarded by archaeologists as being particularly representative of the architecture of Buddhist monastic centers from its era.  Takht-i-Bahi was listed as a UNESCO World Heritage Site in 1980.

Etymology
A monastery under the domain of Purusapura which was also a center for Buddhist learning, the origin of the name Takht-i-Bahi is uncertain. Local belief postulates that site got its name from two wells on the hill, or the springs nearby. In Persian, Takht means 'top' or 'throne' while bahi means 'spring' or 'water'. When combined, its meaning is 'spring from the top' or 'high spring', and there were two springs on the top of mountains. Another meaning suggested is 'throne of origin'.

Location

A small fortified city, dating from the same era, sits nearby. The ruins also sit near a modern village known by the same name. The surrounding area is known for sugar cane, wheat, maize, vegetable, and orchard cultivation. Once remote and little visited, the site now has a road and car park, set below the ruins, and has become popular with visitors.

Structure 
There are four main areas of the Takht Bahi complex:
 The Stupa Court, a cluster of stupas located in a central courtyard.
 The monastic chambers, consisting of individual cells arranged around a courtyard, assembly halls, and a dining area.
 A temple complex, consisting of stupas and similar to the Stupa Court, but of later construction.
 The Tantric monastic complex, which consists of small, dark cells with low openings, which may have been used for certain forms of Tantric meditation.

Additional structures on the site may have served as residences or meeting halls, or for secular purposes.  All of the buildings on the site are constructed from local stone, and are mortared with lime and mud.

History
Archaeologists have divided the history of the complex into four periods, beginning in the 1st century BCE.

The monastic complex was likely founded in the early 1st century CE. It is proven by an inscriptions found bearing the name of Gondophares (2046CE). After Gondophares, the area fell under control of Kujula Kadphises, the first Kushan king. This first era continued until the 2nd century CE, and is associated with another Kushan king Kanishka, as well as early Parthian and subsequent Kushan kings.  The second construction period, which included the creation of the Stupa Court and assembly hall, took place during the 3rd and 4th centuries CE. A third construction period, associated with the later Kushan dynasty and the Kidara Kushana rulers, occurred during the 4th and 5th centuries.

The region was subjugated by Huns in middle of fifth century CE which ended the Kushan rule. The Hun Toramana and then his son Mihirakula slaughtered the inhabitants of the Gandhara region and destroyed most if not all Buddhist monasteries. Evidence suggests that Takht-i-Bahi was destroyed in the same period of destruction by the Huns, however the complex appears to have been in use until 7th century CE.

The first modern historical reference to these ruins was made in 1836 by a French officer who referred to the Buddhist remains in a village named Mazdoorabad. Explorations and excavations on the site began in 1864. A significant number of objects can be found in the British Museum.  The site underwent a major restoration in the 1920s.

Works of art
A famous stair-raiser from Takht-i-Bahi, now in the British Museum, shows devotees in Hellenistic costume.

Nearby localities
The villages of Thordher (Old name Said Ghani Kalae), Ghafe, Lund Khwar, Sher Garh, Saroo Shah, Sehri-Bahlol, Pathai, Mazdoorabad, Fazl-e-abad, Gangai, Hathian, Jalala, Pirsaddi, Takkar and Mashal Khan Kalai are other historical places in the vicinity of Takht-i-Bahi. The most historical location in the era is Sehri Bahlol. The monastery is situated on Malakand Road.

The word "Sehri-Bahlol" has been explained by various people in different ways. Local people claim that this is a Hindko word meaning "Sir Bahlol", a prominent political and religious leader of the area. However, the name is not as old as the village of Sehri-Bahlol.

See also
 List of museums in Pakistan
 List of UNESCO World Heritage Sites in Pakistan
 Ranigat (Another historic site in Buner)

References

External links 

 Buddhist Ruins of Takht-i-Bahi and Neighbouring City Remains at Sahr-i-Bahlol - UNESCO World Heritage List
 UNESCO Periodic Report Summary - Includes a map of the complex.
Map of Gandhara archeological sites, from the Huntington Collection, Ohio State University (large file)

World Heritage Sites in Pakistan
Buddhist sites in Pakistan
Archaeological sites in Pakistan
Mardan District
Buddhism in Pakistan
Former populated places in Pakistan
Archaeological sites in Khyber Pakhtunkhwa